Lagos State Junior Model College Kankon is a state owned secondary school located in Kankon area Badagry, Lagos State.

History
Owing to the change in the organizational structure of secondary schools in Lagos State, Lagos State Junior Model College was carved out from Lagos State Model College Kankon in 2003.

Facilities 
Along with other model colleges in the state, Lagos State Junior Model College, Kankon operates an all boarding schooling system.

Former principals
Mrs S.I Sanni, January 2003 to 13 November 2005
Mrs Adeyemi, 21 November 2005 to 21 February 2007
Mr J.M Ashaka, 21 February to 1 March 2011
Mr Ajose, 2011 to 19 July 2013
Mr J.M Ashaka, 2013 to 1 July 2014
Mrs. S.M Ayo, 2014 to present

References

2003 establishments in Nigeria
Boarding schools in Nigeria
Secondary schools in Lagos State